Golujeh (also Romanized as Golūjeh; also known as Golijeh) is a village in Khvoresh Rostam-e Jonubi Rural District, Khvoresh Rostam District, Khalkhal County, Ardabil Province, Iran. At the 2006 census, its population was 56, in 12 families.

References 

Towns and villages in Khalkhal County